The Bishop of St Davids is the ordinary of the Church in Wales Diocese of St Davids.

The succession of bishops stretches back to Saint David who in the 6th century established his seat in what is today the city of St Davids in Pembrokeshire, founding St Davids Cathedral. The current bishop of St Davids is Joanna Penberthy, since the confirmation on 30 November 2016 of her election.

History 
The history of the diocese of St Davids is traditionally traced to that saint in the latter half of the 6th century. Records of the history of the diocese before Norman times are very fragmentary, however, consisting of a few chance references in old chronicles, such as 'Annales Cambriae' and 'Brut y Tywysogion' (Rolls Series).

Claim of metropolitan status
The early ecclesiastical organisation of the Welsh church is unclear but scanty references reveal that some form of archbishopric definitely existed, with multiple bishops under the jurisdiction of a senior see. One of the earliest mentions of the religious community at St Davids Cathedral comes in the work of Asser who was trained there. In his Life of King Alfred c. 893 Asser clearly describes his kinsman, Nobis, also of St Davids, as Archbishop. In the Annales Cambriae, Elfodd is termed 'archbishop of the land of Gwynedd’ in his obit, under the year 809.

Rhygyfarch's Life of Saint David (c. 1090) states Saint David was anointed as an archbishop by the Patriarch of Jerusalem, a position confirmed at the Synod of Llanddewi Brefi by popular acclaim.

Then, blessed and extolled by the mouth of all, he is with the consent of all the bishops, kings, princes, nobles, and all grades of the whole Britannic race, made archbishop, and his monastery too is declared the metropolis of the whole country, so that whoever ruled it should be accounted archbishop.

Rhygyfarch's claim may be dubious history, but there can be little doubt he was reflecting a pre-existing tradition. It is unclear when St Davids came definitely under the metropolitan jurisdiction of the Archbishop of Canterbury, but about 1115 King Henry I intruded a Norman into the see, Bernard, Bishop of St Davids, who prior to his ordination was confirmed by Canterbury, much to the disgust of the Brut y Tywysogyon which noted that Henry I 'made him bishop in Menevia in contempt of the clerics of the Britons’. Once in place Bernard became convinced that St Davids was a Metropolitan archbishopric (and thus of the same status as Canterbury). Bernard in the 1120s claimed metropolitan jurisdiction over Wales and presented his suit unsuccessfully before six successive popes. Pope Eugenius III was giving the case serious consideration, the issue was to be put to the synod summoned to meet at Rheims in March 1148, but the death of Bernard meant the case lapsed. The idea of Archbishops in Wales was also reflected in the work of Geoffrey of Monmouth. The claim was afterwards revived in the time of Gerald of Wales who pressed it vigorously. The failure of Gerald's campaign saw the claim lapse but it was revived by Owain Glyndŵr's plan for an independent Welsh Church. The idea was also revived in the Reformation: Bishop Richard Davies in the 'Address to the Welsh nation' prefixed to the translation into Welsh of the New Testament by him and William Salesbury referred to 'Archbishop David'. It was only in 1920 that an Archbishop of Wales was re-established.

Further history
The building of the present St Davids Cathedral was begun under Bishop Peter de Leia (1176–1198). In the troubled times of the Reformation the former bishop of St Davids, William Barlow (1536–1548), was a consecrator of Archbishop Matthew Parker in 1559.

At the English Reformation the See ceased to be in communion with Rome, but it continued as a See of the Church of England, and, since disestablishment, of the Church in Wales.

List of bishops

Pre-Reformation bishops
Accounts of the early incumbents on the list are conflicting.

Nominal archbishops

Suffragan bishops

Bishops during the Reformation

Post-Reformation bishops

Bishops of the Church of England

Bishops of the disestablished Church in Wales

Assistant bishops
Prior to serving as Bishop diocesan, Ivor Rees was appointed Assistant Bishop of St Davids and Archdeacon of St Davids in 1988, in order to assist Noakes, by then both diocesan Bishop of St Davids and Archbishop of Wales. Rees was elected diocesan bishop after Noakes' retirement.

References

Bibliography

St. David's
 
Bishop of Saint David's
St Davids
Lists of people by city in Wales